Mount Victoria may refer to either peaks or communities named after Queen Victoria of the United Kingdom.

Peaks
 In Canada
 Mount Victoria (British Columbia)
 Mount Victoria (Bow Range), on the Alberta–British Columbia border

 In New Zealand
 Mount Victoria (Auckland)
 Mount Victoria, Wellington

 Elsewhere
 Mount Tomanivi, formerly Mount Victoria, in Fiji
 Mount Victoria, Palawan, Philippines
 Mount Victoria, Papua New Guinea
 Mount Victoria (Tasmania), Australia
 Nat Ma Taung, also known as Mount Victoria, in Myanmar/Burma

Communities
 Mount Victoria, New South Wales, Australia
 Mount Victoria, Maryland, United States

Electoral districts
 Mount Victoria (New Zealand electorate), a former parliamentary electorate, 1946–1954

See also 

 Victoria Peak (disambiguation)
 Victoria Hill (disambiguation)
 
 Victoria (disambiguation)
 Mount (disambiguation)